Robert Campos (1940 – July 8, 2015) was a Filipino actor with LVN Pictures.

Biography
Campos grew up in Manila. The younger brother of actor Guy Donato, he studied in San Beda from grade 2 until he graduated from college. His former classmates in second grade included other famous actors like Fernando Poe, Jr., Eddie Gutierrez, and Bernard Bonnin.

He married another LVN star Luz Valdez. He made his first movie with Charito Solis and Diomedes Maturan in Rose Tattoo ng Buhay Ko (Rose Tattoo of my Life).

He made several pictures for LVN before the company closed in 1961. His second role was a rock star contestant in Combo Festival in which he was first paired with future wife Luz Valdez.

On July 8, 2015, he suffered a heart attack due to complications from colon cancer.

Filmography

1958 – Rose Tattoo ng Buhay ko
1958 – Combo Festival
1958 - Isang paa sa hukay 
1958 - Sa Puso ni Bathala
1960 - Dahlia 
1961 - Sikat na, Siga Pa
1961 - Luis Latigo
1962 - Bakas ng gagamba 
1962 – Malditong 
1962 - Kadiong Ngiti 
1963 - Ang Mga lawin 
1963 - Palos kontra gagamba 
1963 - Kilabot maghiganti 
1964 - Ang lihim ni gagamba 
1964 - Ginintuang ani 
1964 - Umibig ay di biro 
1965 - Pasko ng limang Magdalena 
1965 - Labanang babae! 
1984 - Kaya kong abutin ang langit 
1984 - Working Girls 
1984 - Soltero (film) 
1984 - Dapat ka bang mahalin? 
1984 - Bagets 
1985 - Mga Kwento ni Lola Basyang 
1985 - Naked Paradise 
1985 - Bed Sins 
1986 - Tu-yay and His Magic Payong

References

Filipino male film actors
1940 births
2015 deaths
San Beda University alumni